Martin Melin (born 6 March 1967), is a Swedish author, police officer, television personality, and the world's first winner of the TV reality series Expedition Robinson (the first of the Survivor series). Melin is the son of historian Jan Melin. In 2010, Melin married author Camilla Läckberg; the now divorced couple have one child together.

Melin won the reality television show Expedition Robinson 1997 on 13 December. In the late 1990s, Melin appeared on numerous shows such as På rymmen, Jakten på ökenguldet and Hon och han. In 2015, he participated in the reality series Realitystjärnorna på godset alongside some of Sweden's best-known reality-series stars, such as Gunilla Persson. That series was broadcast on TV3.

Melin published a book called Coola pappor.

Melin will become a member of the Riksdagen for the Liberal party on 31 October 2022, for six months, replacing Joar Forssell who goes on parental leave.

References

External links
Martin Melin blog on Coola Pappor

1967 births
Writers from Stockholm
Swedish male writers
Swedish police officers
Swedish television personalities
Living people